Murchison-Eyre was an electoral district of the Legislative Assembly in the Australian state of Western Australia from 1890 to 1989 and again from 2005 to 2008.

Known as Murchison until 1968, it was one of the original 30 seats contested at the 1890 election. The district was located in the Western Australian outback. The seat was abolished ahead of the 1989 election.

Revived for the 2005 election, Murchison-Eyre was won by Labor candidate John Bowler, previously member for the abolished Eyre. The district lasted one term before it was abolished ahead of the 2008 election. Its former territory was divided between the districts of Eyre, Kalgoorlie, North West, and Pilbara. Bowler, by this time an independent, successfully contested the seat of Kalgoorlie.

Members for Murchison-Eyre

Election results

External links
 
 

Murchison-Eyre
Goldfields-Esperance